Michigan's 18th congressional district is an obsolete United States congressional district in Michigan. The first Representative to Congress elected from the 18th district, George Anthony Dondero, took office in 1953, after reapportionment due to the 1950 census. In 1933, Dondero had previously been the first representative elected from 17th district.

From 1982 until its demise the 18th district included parts of three counties.  It included Brighton, Brighton Township and Green Oak Township in Livingston County, Michigan, Lyon Township, South Lyon, New Hudson, Milford, Milford Township, Wixom, Walled Lake, Wolverine Lake, Commerce Township, Novi, the Oakland county portion of Northville, Farmington, Farmington Hills, West Bloomfield Township, Orchard Lake, Keego Harbor, Sylvan Lake, Bloomfield Township, Franklin, Bingham Farms, Beverly Hills, Bloomfield Hills, Birmingham, Troy (except the southeast corner of Troy, south of Big Beaver and east of Rochester Road), Auburn Hills, Rochester Hills, Rochester, Orion Township, Lake Orion, Lake Angelus, Oakland Township and Addison Township in Oakland County.  It also included Romeo, Washington Township, Shelby Township and Bruce Township in Macomb County.

List of members representing the district

References

 The Political graveyard: U.S. Representatives from Michigan, 1807-2003
 U.S. Representatives 1837-2003, Michigan Manual 2003-2004

 Congressional Biographical Directory of the United States 1774–present

18
Former congressional districts of the United States
Constituencies established in 1953
1953 establishments in Michigan
Constituencies disestablished in 1993
1993 disestablishments in Michigan